Neocollyris longipes is a species of ground beetle in the genus Neocollyris in the family Carabidae. It was described by Naviaux and Cassola in 2005.  It is a sub-family of Cicindelinae Latreille.

References

Longipes, Neocollyris
Beetles described in 2005